William Rowley Elliston OBE, (1 February 1869 – 12 February 1954), was a British judge and Liberal Party politician.

Background
Elliston was born in Manor House, Ipswich, the eldest son of W.A. Elliston. He was educated at Ipswich School and Christ's College, Cambridge. He was a Pemberton Scholar, at Ipswich School in 1885. He was elected simultaneously in 1887 to Open Classical Demyship at Magdalen College, Oxford and Open Classical Scholarship at Christ's College, Cambridge. In 1898 he married Ethel Mary Walton, niece of Sir Frederick Wilson. They had one son and two daughters. He was awarded the OBE in the 1951 Birthday Honours for public services in Suffolk.

Political career
Elliston's first involvement in politics came in 1905 when he was elected to Ipswich Borough Council. He served on this body for the next 23 years. He was Liberal candidate for the Woodbridge division of Suffolk at the December 1910 General Election. The constituency was a Conservative marginal that the Liberals had last won in 1906. He was unable to re-gain the seat. He contested Woodbridge a further three times without success. In 1918 endorsement from the Coalition Government was given to his Unionist opponent, regardless he polled a credible 44.2%. Despite this good showing, he did not contest the 1920 Woodbridge by-election or the 1922 General Election. Following Liberal reunion, he contested the 1923 General Election. However, by now, the Labour Party were running candidates at Woodbridge. The Unionist was returned on a minority vote, while Elliston came second. At the 1924 General Election, he again came second. In 1927 he served as Mayor of Ipswich for a year. He was Liberal candidate for the Colchester division of Essex at the 1929 General Election. Colchester was a Unionist/Labour marginal seat offering little chance for a Liberal. He finished third. He did not stand for parliament again. In 1932, after a break from Ipswich Council, he was appointed as a Council Alderman, serving until 1938.

Other Activities

Elliston was leader writer for the East Anglian Daily Times in 1900.

Electoral record

References

1869 births
1954 deaths
Liberal Party (UK) parliamentary candidates
People educated at Ipswich School
Alumni of Christ's College, Cambridge
Members of Lincoln's Inn
British Army personnel of World War I
Officers of the Order of the British Empire
Councillors in Suffolk
Mayors of Ipswich, Suffolk
Suffolk Regiment officers